King for a Day may refer to:

Film and television
 King for a Day (1940 film), a 1940 cartoon short in Max Fleischer's Gabby series
 King for a Day (1934 film), a 1934 short film starring legendary tap dancer Bill "Bojangles" Robinson
 King for a Day (1933 film), a Bollywood film starring Begum Akhtar
 King for a Day (1983 film), a Bulgarian film starring Todor Kolev
 "King for a Day" (Hercules: The Legendary Journeys), a 1996 episode of Hercules: The Legendary Journeys
 "King for a Day" (Joe 90), an episode of Joe 90
 "King for a Day" (Mia and Me), an episode of Mia and Me
 "King for a Day", a two-part episode of Power Rangers: Zeo
 Kings for a Day, a 1997 French film

Music
 "King for a Day" (Jamiroquai song)
 "King for a Day" (Thompson Twins song), 1985
 "King for a Day" (XTC song), 1989
 "King for a Day" (Pierce the Veil song), 2012
 "King for a Day", a song by Battle Beast from the album Bringer of Pain
 "King for a Day", a song by Faith No More from the album King for a Day... Fool for a Lifetime
 "King for a Day", a song by Forever the Sickest Kids from Forever the Sickest Kids
 "King for a Day", a song by Goldfinger song from Goldfinger
 "King for a Day", a song by Green Day from Nimrod
 "King for a Day", a song by Unisonic from Unisonic
 "King for a Day", a song from the musical The Real Ambassadors
 King for a Day, an album by Bobby Conn
 King for a Day, a tribute album by Micky Dolenz containing covers of songs written by Carole King
 King for a Day, a CD by Jason Wilber

See also
 Un giorno di regno, an 1840 opera by Giuseppe Verdi
 Queen for a Day, an American radio and television game show
 President for One Day (disambiguation)